Qarah Tappeh is a village in Razakan Rural District, in the Central District of Shahriar County, Tehran Province, Iran. At the 2006 census, its population was 265, in 61 families.

References 

Populated places in Shahriar County